Roy Walter Hollis (24 December 1925 – 12 November 1998) was a footballer and is a member of the Norwich City Hall of Fame.

Great Yarmouth-born Hollis made 107 appearances for Norwich as a centre-forward between 1948 and 1952, scoring 59 times.

Hollis scored a hat-trick in less than 30 minutes on debut for Norwich. Of all Norwich's top-20 scorers (see List of Norwich City F.C. club records), his rate of a goal every 1.81 games is the best. His best return was five goals versus Walsall F.C. in 1951. After he left Norwich, he played for Tottenham Hotspur and Southend United F.C. He scored a hat-trick for the latter at Carrow Road in 1954, the "only player to score three times for and against City on the ground."

He was selected to play for the Third Division South representative team in 1956/57and 1957/58.

External links
Fact-file

References

1925 births
1998 deaths
English footballers
Great Yarmouth Town F.C. players
Norwich City F.C. players
Tottenham Hotspur F.C. players
Southend United F.C. players
Chelmsford City F.C. players
Lowestoft Town F.C. players
English Football League players
Sportspeople from Great Yarmouth
Association football forwards